L'Isle-Adam is a commune in the Val-d'Oise department in Île-de-France in northern France. The small town beside the river Oise has a long sandy beach and attracts visitors from Paris.

Geography
L'Isle-Adam is a commune and town in north central Val-d'Oise. It is on the northern fringe of the urban area of Paris, near the Regional Natural Park of French Vexin.

The Oise borders the town on its north and west sides, and the town is partially built on three islands, the Ile du Prieuré, the Ile de la Cohue and the Ile de la Dérivation, by which there is a dam and lock. Several small streams flow through the town and there are also ponds and small lakes in the vicinity. A bridge carrying RD 64 connects L'Isle-Adam with Parmain. L'Isle-Adam–Parmain station has rail connections to Persan, Creil, Pontoise and Paris.

Population

Tourism
L'Isle-Adam has several historic sites and was the haunt of impressionist painters such as Charles-François Daubigny and Jean Droit. Saint-Martin's Church is noteworthy as well as the Château of Stors and its chapel. The Château was damaged in World War II and afterwards abandoned, but is being renovated. It is surrounded by terraced gardens and parkland at the edge of the national forest known as the "Forêt de L'Isle-Adam". In the Parc de Cassan, there are a pair of unusual eighteenth century Chinese pavilions, each with a hexagonal plan and a pagoda-shaped roof.

L'Isle-Adam has a long sandy beach beside the river and is popular with Parisian families in summer. There is a swimming pool and also facilities for tennis, canoeing, rowing and other sports, as well as a children's playground.

Personalities
Aimée Antoinette Camus – botanist
Jean Droit - Artist

See also
Château de L'Isle-Adam
Communes of the Val-d'Oise department

References

External links

Association of Mayors of the Val d'Oise 
Official website 

Communes of Val-d'Oise
Val-d'Oise communes articles needing translation from French Wikipedia